Santo & Johnny is the debut album by the homonymous duo, released in 1959. The album includes the duo's best known instrumental, "Sleep Walk".

Releases 
Canadian-American Records distributed the album in Canada in 1959 and the label Orfeón released it in Venezuela in the same year.

Singles 
The track "Sleep Walk" rose to number 1 of the Billboard Hot 100 in 1959. The band's rendition of "Caravan" entered the charts in 1960 and it peaked at number 48.

Performances 
The instrumentals "All Night Diner" and "Sleep Walk" were performed on The Perry Como Show in 1959.

"Sleep Walk" was also performed on American Bandstand.

Legacy 
"Sleep Walk" was frequently used on commercials, TV shows and movies. Examples include: Highston, La Bamba, Heroes and many others.

The recording "Caravan" was used in a few movies such as Breakfast on Pluto.

Track listing 
Side one
 "Caravan"
 "Summertime"
 "All Night Diner"
 "Blue Moon"
 "School Day"
 "Sleep Walk"

Side two
 "Tenderly"
 "Slave Girl"
 "Dream"
 "Canadian Sunset"
 "Harbor Lights"
 "Raunchy"

Personnel 
 Santo Farina – steel guitar
 Johnny Farina – guitar
 Mike Dee – drums
 Bob Davie – conductor, arrangement

References 

1959 debut albums
Santo & Johnny albums